Tasty is the third studio album by American singer Kelis, released on December 5, 2003, by Star Trak Entertainment and Arista Records. As executive producer, Kelis enlisted previous collaborators the Neptunes to produce the album, as well as new collaborators such as Raphael Saadiq, Dallas Austin, André 3000, Rockwilder, and Dame Blackmon "Grease". It also features guest vocals from Saadiq, André 3000, and then-boyfriend Nas.

The album was met with positive reviews from critics, who praised its originality and viewed it as an improvement on Kelis' previous albums, Kaleidoscope (1999) and Wanderland (2001). Tasty debuted at number 27 on the Billboard 200 with first-week sales of 93,600 copies, earning Kelis the best sales week of her career in the United States. The album also became her highest-peaking album in the United Kingdom, where it peaked at number 11 on the UK Albums Chart. It spawned four singles: "Milkshake", "Trick Me", "Millionaire", and "In Public".

One of the Neptunes-produced tracks on the album, "Flashback", was originally included on Wanderland, which was not initially released in North America upon release.

Singles
"Milkshake" was released on August 25, 2003, as the lead single from Tasty. It reached number three on the US Billboard Hot 100, becoming Kelis' highest-peaking single on the chart to date. The song was certified gold by the Recording Industry Association of America (RIAA) on October 25, 2004, and has sold 883,000 digital downloads in the United States. "Milkshake" also achieved commercial success internationally, reaching number one on the Irish Singles Chart and number two on the UK Singles Chart, as well as peaking inside the top five in Australia, Denmark, New Zealand, Norway, and Sweden. The song was nominated for a Grammy Award for Best Urban/Alternative Performance in 2004.

"Trick Me" was released on February 17, 2004, as the second single from the album. The track was successful in Europe and Oceania; it peaked at number two on the UK Singles Chart, while charting inside the top five in Australia, Ireland, New Zealand, and Norway, and the top 10 in Austria, Denmark, Germany, and Switzerland.

"Millionaire", which features André 3000, was released as the album's third single on October 18, 2004. The song peaked at number three on the UK Singles Chart, becoming the album's third consecutive top-three entry. "Millionaire" attained modest success elsewhere, reaching number 11 in Finland, number 23 in Australia, and number 27 in New Zealand.

The album's fourth and final single, "In Public", features Nas and was released on April 4, 2005. The song reached number 17 on the UK chart and number 22 on the Irish chart.

Critical reception

Tasty received generally positive reviews from music critics. At Metacritic, which assigns a normalized rating out of 100 to reviews from mainstream publications, the album received an average score of 80, based on 18 reviews. Andy Kellman of AllMusic stated, "Despite all the new assistance, Tasty is formatted much like Kaleidoscope and Wanderland, constantly swinging back and forth between bouncy pop and laid-back (not throwback) soul." Ernest Hardy of Rolling Stone praised Tasty as Kelis' "best work" and wrote, "Take away the Dallas Austin-produced tracks [...], two Neptunes rock attempts and 'Milkshake', and you have a solid R&B album, one that's thickly speckled with hip-hop influences and nods to early Prince and Eighties Latin freestyle music." Entertainment Weeklys Neil Drumming described the album as "Kelis' past—big beats, out-there imagery, and sex appeal—refined" and commented that "much of the beauty of Tasty is in witnessing Kelis rise to the challenge of working with multiple imaginative maestros." In a review for NME, Tony Naylor found the album to be "[f]ar more complete than Wanderland or Kaleidoscope", adding that "such vacuum-packed musical freshness is maintained throughout."

Dorian Lynskey of The Guardian dubbed Kelis a "parallel universe Beyoncé" and wrote that she "exploits her husky croon like never before, pouring it over lascivious double entendre [...] and, well, lascivious single entrendre", concluding, "She may not be R&B's biggest star, but Kelis remains its most compelling character." The Independent noted that she "certainly takes the sexual initiative in several songs", but "[m]ostly, though, Kelis keeps a watchful eye on her affections in songs such as 'Protect My Heart' and 'Trick Me', and has developed a decidedly jaundiced view of hip hop's lop-sided sexual politics, judging by 'Keep It Down'." Joseph Patel of Blender commented that Kelis is "as good playing a hair-twisting, gum-popping tart on 'Sugar Honey Iced Tea' as an all-grown-up cock-blocker on the crackling funk ditty 'Trick Me'." Slant Magazine reviewer Sal Cinquemani felt that few of the tracks on the album are "as immediately thirst-quenching as the insta-classic lead single 'Milkshake'", and Pitchforks Scott Plagenhoef opined that Tasty is "far from all doom-and-gloom". Adam Webb of Yahoo! Music expressed that the album is "not as far out wild as Kaleidoscope but it is a consistently inventive and brilliant record." Steve Jones of USA Today viewed that, "guests and idiosyncrasies aside, her honeyed voice is the most important ingredient. It's sweet enough to make you wonder, 'Did she just say that?' No one could ever accuse her of being bland."

Commercial performance
Tasty debuted at number 27 on the Billboard 200 with 93,600 copies sold in its first week; it gave Kelis the best chart week of her career, and became her second highest-peaking album to date, after Kelis Was Here (2006). The album was certified gold by the RIAA on February 6, 2004, and had sold 535,000 copies in the United States as of December 2009.

The album debuted at number 53 on the UK Albums Chart, climbing to number 21 the following week. In its third week on the chart, the album rose to its peak position of number 11, becoming Kelis' highest-charting album in the UK to date. Tasty was certified platinum by the British Phonographic Industry (BPI) on October 22, 2004, and by April 2014, it had sold 476,034 copies in the United Kingdom.

Track listing

Notes
  signifies a co-producer
  signifies a remixer

Sample credits
 "Keep It Down" contains excerpts and samples from "I Used to Love H.E.R." by Common.
 "Millionaire" contains excerpts and samples from "La Di Da Di" by Doug E. Fresh and Slick Rick.

Personnel
Credits adapted from the liner notes of Tasty.

Musicians

 Kelis – vocals
 Dallas Austin – arrangement 
 Tony Reyes – guitar, background vocals 
 Greg "Ruckus" Andrews – DJ 
 Nas – vocals 
 André 3000 – vocals, drums, music programming, keyboards 
 Kevin Kendricks – keyboards, piano 
 Raphael Saadiq – guitar ; bass ; vocals 
 Kelvin Wooten – keyboards ; piano, sitar ; bass, guitar 
 Jake and the Phatman – drums ; percussion, scratches ; drum programming

Technical

 Dallas Austin – production 
 Rick Sheppard – recording 
 Carlton Lynn – recording 
 Doug Harms – recording assistance 
 Cesar Guevara – recording assistance 
 Kevin "KD" Davis – mixing 
 The Neptunes – production 
 Andrew "Drew" Coleman – recording 
 Daniel Betancourt – recording assistance 
 Phil Tan – mixing 
 Tim Olmstead – mixing assistance 
 Rockwilder – production 
 Mike Koch – recording 
 Dave Pensado – mixing 
 Serban Ghenea – mixing 
 Pat "Pat 'Em Down" Viala – recording 
 André 3000 – production 
 Matthew Still – recording 
 Vincent Alexander – recording 
 James Majors – recording 
 Warren Bletcher – recording assistance 
 Dexter Simmons – mixing 
 Andrew Dawson – mixing assistance 
 Regina Davenport – production coordinator 
 Raphael Saadiq – production 
 Jake and the Phatman – co-production 
 Kelvin Wooten – co-production 
 Gerry Brown – recording 
 John Tanksley – recording, mixing assistance ; recording assistance 
 Daniel Romero – mixing 
 Anette Sharvit – production coordinator 
 Dame Blackmon "Grease" – production 
 Glen Marchese – recording, mixing 
 Geoffrey Rice – mixing assistance 
 Kelis – executive production
 Chris Athens – mastering

Artwork
 Joe Mama-Nitzberg – creative direction
 Jeffrey Schulz – art, layout
 Markus Klinko – photography
 Indrani – photography

Charts

Weekly charts

Year-end charts

Certifications

Release history

Notes

References

External links
 

2003 albums
Albums produced by André 3000
Albums produced by Dallas Austin
Albums produced by Dame Grease
Albums produced by the Neptunes
Albums produced by Raphael Saadiq
Albums produced by Rockwilder
Arista Records albums
Kelis albums
Star Trak Entertainment albums
Virgin Records albums